Pratts Fork is an unincorporated community in Athens County, in the U.S. state of Ohio.

History
A post office called Pratts Fork was established in 1869, and remained in operation until 1944. Beside the post office, Pratts Fork had a country store.

References

Unincorporated communities in Athens County, Ohio
1869 establishments in Ohio
Populated places established in 1869
Unincorporated communities in Ohio